Victor Emmanuel Livingstone Houston (born February 24, 1974) is a retired male track and field athlete from Barbados.

Career

He twice represented his native country at the Summer Olympics: 1996 and 2000. He competed in the men's decathlon and hurdling events during his career. Since 2011, Houston has been an assistant track and field coach at Texas Tech University.

Achievements

External links
sports-reference

Picture of Victor Houston

References

1974 births
Living people
Barbadian decathletes
Barbadian male hurdlers
Athletes (track and field) at the 1996 Summer Olympics
Athletes (track and field) at the 2000 Summer Olympics
Olympic athletes of Barbados
Athletes (track and field) at the 1994 Commonwealth Games
Athletes (track and field) at the 1998 Commonwealth Games
Athletes (track and field) at the 1999 Pan American Games
Commonwealth Games competitors for Barbados
Pan American Games competitors for Barbados
Texas Tech Red Raiders track and field coaches